The 2016 Big Ten Conference men's soccer season was the 26th season of men's varsity soccer in the conference.

The Ohio State Buckeyes and the Maryland Terrapins are the defending regular season and tournament champions, respectively.

Preseason

Preseason poll 
The preseason poll was released on August 17.

Teams

Stadia and locations 

 Illinois, Iowa, Minnesota, Nebraska and Purdue do not sponsor men's soccer

Personnel

Regular season

Results

Rankings

Postseason

Big Ten tournament

NCAA tournament

All-Big Ten awards and teams

See also 

 Big Ten Conference
 2016 Big Ten Conference Men's Soccer Tournament
 2016 NCAA Division I men's soccer season
 2016 in American soccer

References 

 
2016 NCAA Division I men's soccer season
2016